Harrison Zolnierczyk (born September 1, 1987) is a Canadian former professional ice hockey left winger. Zolnierczyk was never drafted into the National Hockey League (NHL) but played for the Philadelphia Flyers, Pittsburgh Penguins, New York Islanders, Anaheim Ducks and Nashville Predators.

Playing career
As a youth, Zolnierczyk played in the 2001 Quebec International Pee-Wee Hockey Tournament with the Mississauga Senators minor ice hockey team.

Prior to turning professional, Zolnierczyk played junior A for the Alberni Valley Bulldogs of the BCHL from 2005–2007 before attending Brown University where he played four seasons with the Brown Bears in Division I of the NCAA, ECAC conference. In his senior season with Brown, Zolnierczyk was named team captain, replacing graduating captain Aaron Volpatti. After scoring 31 points, including a career-high 16 goals, Zolnierczyk was named Ivy League Player of the Year.

On March 8, 2011, Zolnierczyk signed a one-year, $900,000 entry-level contract with the Philadelphia Flyers to take effect at the outset of the 2011–12 season. Less than a week later, he signed an amateur tryout contract with the Flyers' American Hockey League (AHL) affiliate, the Adirondack Phantoms. In sixteen games with the Phantoms, Zolnierczyk finished the 2010–11 season with three goals, two assists, and 37 penalty in minutes.

After being cut by the Flyers on October 4, 2011, following his first NHL training camp and pre-season, Zolnierczyk was assigned to the Phantoms to begin his first full professional ice hockey season. On October 18, 2011, the Flyers re-called Zolnierczyk to replace injured forward Andreas Nödl in a game against the Ottawa Senators. In the first game of his NHL career, he scored his first NHL goal with 45 seconds remaining in the third period against Senators' goaltender Craig Anderson. On March 3, 2013, the league suspended him for four games for charging Mike Lundin during the game.

On April 1, 2013, Zolnierczyk was traded to the Anaheim Ducks in exchange for enforcer Jay Rosehill. Two months later on June 24, 2013, the Ducks traded him to the Pittsburgh Penguins in exchange for defenceman Alex Grant. On July 12, 2013, the Penguins signed him to a one-year, two-way contract, worth $550,000.

On July 1, 2014, Zolnierczyk left the Penguins and agreed to a one-year two-way free agent contract with the New York Islanders. He was assigned to their AHL affiliate, the Bridgeport Sound Tigers, after clearing waivers. Later on in the Islanders' 2014–15 season, he was recalled to the team along with Colin McDonald after injuries sidelined forwards Michael Grabner and Cal Clutterbuck, but was returned to the Sound Tigers after two games.

On July 3, 2015, Zolnierczyk signed as a free agent to a one-year, two-way contract with the Anaheim Ducks.

On July 1, 2016, having concluded his contract with the Ducks, Zolnierczyk agreed to a one-year, two-way deal with his fifth NHL club, the Nashville Predators. Zolnierczyk split the 2016–17 season evenly between the Predators and Milwaukee Admirals of the AHL. Adding a physical presence to the fourth line of the Predators, Zolnierczyk appeared in 24 games for 2 goals and 4 points. He made his post-season debut in featuring in 11 games for 3 points as the Predators made it to the Stanley Cup finals.

As a free agent in the off-season, the Florida Panthers signed Zolnierczyk to a professional try-out contract to attend training camp on August 31, 2017. Despite initial reports of being a contract, Zolnierczyk was released from his try-out following the conclusion of training camp and the pre-season on October 1, 2017. Two days later, Zolnierczyk was announced to have returned to the Nashville Predators in re-signing to a one-year, two-way contract for the 2017–18 season.

Having played two seasons within the Predators organization, Zolnierczyk as a free agent again acquainted with the Florida Panthers, securing a one-year AHL contract with affiliate, the Springfield Thunderbirds, on July 12, 2018.

As a free agent and having left the Thunderbirds, Zolnierczyk agreed to a one-year AHL contract with the Hartford Wolf Pack, affiliate to the New York Rangers, on July 1, 2019. Zolnierczyk failed to report for training camp with the Wolf Pack, opting to end his professional career prior to the 2019–20 season.

Personal life

On June 6, 2017, it was announced that Zolnierczyk would participate in the Foxboro Summer Pro League, at the Foxboro Sports Center in Foxboro, Massachusetts, as the captain for Team Pop Tops. On August 23, 2017, at the Foxboro Sports Center, Zolnierczyk led his team to a 10-9 championship final win, he won an award for classiest played called the "Dennis Cutler Sportsmanship Award" after giving game-used sticks to two local teenagers who had supported the team.

Career statistics

Awards and honours

References

External links
 

1987 births
Living people
Adirondack Phantoms players
Anaheim Ducks players
Bridgeport Sound Tigers players
Brown Bears men's ice hockey players
Canadian ice hockey left wingers
Canadian people of Ukrainian descent
Milwaukee Admirals players
Nashville Predators players
New York Islanders players
Norfolk Admirals players
Philadelphia Flyers players
Pittsburgh Penguins players
San Diego Gulls (AHL) players
Ice hockey people from Toronto
Springfield Thunderbirds players
Undrafted National Hockey League players
Wilkes-Barre/Scranton Penguins players